The 1930 Tour de France was the 24th edition of the Tour de France, one of cycling's Grand Tours. The Tour began in Paris with a flat stage on 2 July, and Stage 11 occurred on 14 July with a flat stage to Montpellier. The race finished in Paris on 27 July.

Stage 1
2 July 1930 - Paris to Caen,

Stage 2
3 July 1930 - Caen to Dinan,

Stage 3
4 July 1930 - Dinan to Brest,

Stage 4
5 July 1930 - Brest to Vannes,

Stage 5
6 July 1930 - Vannes to Les Sables d'Olonne,

Stage 6
7 July 1930 - Les Sables d'Olonne to Bordeaux,

Stage 7
8 July 1930 - Bordeaux to Hendaye,

Stage 8
9 July 1930 - Hendaye to Pau,

Stage 9
10 July 1930 - Pau to Luchon,

Stage 10
12 July 1930 - Luchon to Perpignan,

Stage 11
14 July 1930 - Perpignan to Montpellier,

References

1930 Tour de France
Tour de France stages